The 1996 Catalan motorcycle Grand Prix was the thirteenth round of the 1996 Grand Prix motorcycle racing season. It took place on 15 September 1996 at the Circuit de Catalunya.

500 cc classification

250 cc classification

125 cc classification

References

Catalan motorcycle Grand Prix
Catalan
Catalan Motorcycle Grand Prix
motorcycle